Emilio José Zelaya (born 30 July 1987 in San Miguel de Tucumán) is an Argentine with Italian passport football forward, who plays for Ohod.

Zelaya made his first team debut in 2006, but he came to prominence in 2008 after scoring two goals in a 3–1 away win against Olimpo de Bahía Blanca on 14 March 2008.

Career

O'Higgins

In July 2015, he joined O'Higgins for one season, starting for the 2015–16 season.

Career statistics

Honours
Arsenal
Argentine Primera División (1): 2012 Clausura
Supercopa Argentina (1): 2012
Copa Argentina (1): 2013

References

External links
 Argentine Primera statistics  
 Football-Lineups player profile
 

1987 births
Living people
Sportspeople from San Miguel de Tucumán
Argentine footballers
Argentine expatriate footballers
Association football forwards
Rosario Central footballers
Club Atlético Banfield footballers
Arsenal de Sarandí footballers
O'Higgins F.C. footballers
Argentinos Juniors footballers
Ethnikos Achna FC players
Apollon Limassol FC players
Damac FC players
Ohod Club players
Chilean Primera División players
Argentine Primera División players
Cypriot First Division players
Saudi Professional League players
Saudi First Division League players
Expatriate footballers in Chile
Expatriate footballers in Cyprus
Expatriate footballers in Saudi Arabia
Argentine expatriate sportspeople in Chile
Argentine expatriate sportspeople in Cyprus
Argentine expatriate sportspeople in Saudi Arabia